Anthony Markanich (born December 26, 1999) is an American professional soccer player who plays for Colorado Rapids in Major League Soccer.

Career

Youth 
Markanich attended Bradley-Bourbonnais Community High School, where he scored 40 goals and had 14 assists as a senior in 2017, helping the Boilermakers to a third-place finish in the Illinois 3A State Tournament while earning all-state honors. Markanich also played club soccer for Chicago Fire between 2015 and 2016, making 24 appearances. He later played with Olympiacos Chicago, who won the US Club Soccer 2018 U19 Super Group National Championship.

College and amateur 
In 2018, Markanich attended Northern Illinois University to play college soccer. In four seasons with the Huskies, Markanich made 67 appearances, scoring 17 goals and tallying 24 assists. He was a three-time First Team All-MAC honoree and a four-time All-MAC honoree. His 24 career assists are tied for second all-time in program history while his 58 total points were ninth best in NIU history.

While at college, Markanich played with USL League Two side Green Bay Voyageurs between 2019 and 2021, without the 2020 season been cancelled due to the COVID-19 pandemic. In total, he made twelve appearances, scoring three goals and tallying three assists.

Professional 
On January 11, 2022, Markanich was drafted 26th overall in the 2022 MLS SuperDraft by Colorado Rapids. He signed a one-year deal with the Rapids on March 3, 2022. He made his first-team debut on May 22, 2022, starting in a 1–0 win over Seattle Sounders.

Personal life 
Markanich has a twin brother, Nick Markanich, who also plays professional soccer, most recently playing with FC Cincinnati.

References

External links 
 Anthony Markanich MLS profile
 Anthony Markanich at NIU Huskies

Living people
1999 births
American soccer players
Association football defenders
Northern Illinois Huskies men's soccer players
Colorado Rapids players
Colorado Rapids draft picks
Colorado Rapids 2 players
Major League Soccer players
MLS Next Pro players
Soccer players from Illinois
USL League Two players
American sportspeople of Filipino descent